The 2004 Spar European Cup took place on 19 and 20 June 2004 at the Zdzisław Krzyszkowiak Stadium in Bydgoszcz, Poland. This was the 25th European Cup and the first time the event was hosted by Poland.

Events

Super League

Final standings

Men's events

Women's events

First League

Group A
19–20 June 2004  Plovdiv

Group B
19–20 June 2004  Istanbul

Second League

Group A
19–20 June 2004  Reykjavík

Group B
19–20 June 2004  Novi Sad

External links
 european-athletics.org – 2004 SPAR European Cup Results

2004
European Cup
Athletics
Athletics
Sport in Istanbul
Athletics
Athletics
Athletics
International athletics competitions hosted by Iceland
International athletics competitions hosted by Turkey
International athletics competitions hosted by Poland
International athletics competitions hosted by Bulgaria
International sports competitions hosted by Iceland
June 2004 sports events in Europe
21st century in Novi Sad
2000s in Reykjavík
2000s in Istanbul
History of Bydgoszcz